William Arthur Davis (born 28 July 1877, date of death unknown) was a British-born cyclist who competed for France in the men's sprint event at the 1900 Summer Olympics.

References

External links
 

1877 births
Year of death missing
French male cyclists
Olympic cyclists of France
Cyclists at the 1900 Summer Olympics
Sportspeople from Bristol
Place of death missing
British emigrants to France